The Trillium Lakelands District School Board (TLDSB, known as English-language Public District School Board No. 15 prior to 1999) administers public school education for students in a large area of central Ontario, Canada including the municipalities of the City of Kawartha Lakes, Haliburton County, and the District Municipality of Muskoka.  It manages 41 elementary schools, 7 secondary schools and 7 Adult Education and Training Centres.

History
In 1999 the Victoria County Board of Education, Muskoka Board of Education, and the Haliburton County Board of Education were amalgamated into the Trillium Lakelands District School Board.

The Trillium Lakelands District School Board was involved in a landmark legal decision in Ontario, Canada regarding the responsibility of school boards for sexual abuse of students. On June 30, 2021, Justice Salmers of the Ontario Superior Court of Justice found the Trillium Lakelands District School Board vicariously liable in a historical sexual abuse lawsuit.  The case related to the sexual abuse of a student by a former teacher, Royce Galon Willamson dating back to the 1980s. Williamson was the victim's music teacher. The school board alone was ordered to pay over $500,000 to compensate the victim.

Secondary schools

The following is a list of the secondary schools managed by the TLDSB.

Elementary schools

 Mariposa Elementary School
 Archie Stouffer Elementary School
 Bobcaygeon Public School
 Bracebridge Public School
 Cardiff Elementary School
 Central Senior School
 Dr. George Hall Public School
 Dunsford District Elementary School
 Fenelon Township Public School
 Glen Orchard Public School
 Grandview Public School
 Gravenhurst Public School
 Honey Harbour Public School
 Huntsville Public School
 Irwin Memorial Public School
 JD Hodgson Elementary School
 Jack Callaghan Public School
 King Albert Public School
 KP Manson Public School
 Lady Eaton Elementary School
 Lady MacKenzie Public School
 Langton Public School
 Leslie Frost Public School
 Macaulay Public School
 Alexandra Public School
 Monck Public School
 Muskoka Beechgrove Public School
 Muskoka Falls Public School
 Parkview Public School
 Pine Glen Public School
 Queen Victoria Public School
 Ridgewood Public School
 Riverside Public School
 Rolling Hills Public School
 Scott Young Public School
 Spruce Glen Public School
 Stuart Baker Elementary School
 VK Greer Memorial Public School
 Watt Public School
 Wilberforce Elementary School
 Woodville Elementary School

Alternate Education and Training Centres

 Bracebridge AETC
 Fenelon Falls AETC
 Gravenhurst AETC
 Haliburton AETC
 Huntsville AETC
 Lindsay AETC
 Virtual Learning Centre

TLDSB also operates six Alternate Education and Training Centres (Bracebridge AETC, Fenelon Falls AETC, Gravenhurst AETC, Haliburton AETC, Huntsville AETC, and Lindsay AETC) and the Virtual Learning Centre (VLC).  The VLC has offered online courses since 1997, and is the oldest fully online school in Ontario.

See also

Simcoe Muskoka Catholic District School Board
List of school districts in Ontario
List of high schools in Ontario

References

External links
Trillium Lakelands District School Board official website
Virtual Learning Centre

School districts in Ontario
Education in Haliburton County
Education in Kawartha Lakes
Education in the District Municipality of Muskoka
Educational institutions with year of establishment missing